Římov Reservoir is a reservoir in České Budějovice District.

See also
List of dams and reservoirs in the Czech Republic

References

Reservoirs and dams in the Czech Republic